

Dinosaurs
 On June 30, Sir Richard Owen presents his findings regarding some enormous bones that the Reverend William Buckland had acquired at an earlier date. He names the new genus to which these bones belong "Cetiosaurus." This event marks the first scientific description of a sauropod.
 Owen presents his treatise on British fossil reptiles to the British Association in August. This treatise marks the creation of a taxon called "Dinosauria."

Newly named dinosaurs

Plesiosaurs

New taxa

Synapsids

Non-mammalian

References

1840s in paleontology
Paleontology